Proshika (Proshika Centre for Human Development) is a Bangladesh-based organization. It was founded in 1976 by Dr. Qazi Faruque Ahmed. Proshika promotes self-reliance among the poor through a network of local organizations. Major emphasis is placed on agriculture, forestry, health education, disaster management, advocacy, and literacy. 12 million have been trained by Proshika.

History 
Dr. Qazi Faruque Ahmed established Proshika in 1977. Dr. Qazi Faruque Ahmed established Proshika to train and educate and increase social empowerment. Muhammad Yahiya, one of the founders of Proshika, later left the NGO to establish Centre for Development Innovation and Practices. The name comes from the Bengali words for training (proshikkhan), education (shikkha), and work (kaj). It's headquarters in Mirpur were designed by Mubasshar Hussain. The NGO had a 30 member general body which elects a nine member governing body.

On 19 April 2004, Bangladesh Jatiotabadi Jubo Dal, the youth wing of the Bangladesh Nationalist Party, laid siege to Proshikha headquarters demanding that the government cancel their NGO registration. They were led S. A. Khaleque, the local member of parliament and Ahsanullah Hassan, Mirpur Ward six Commissioner. The next day workers of Proshika were arrested by law enforcement agents. Bangladesh Nationalist Party government, which had come to power in 2001 had restricted foreign donations to Proshika. Dr. Qazi Faruque Ahmed and David William Biswas of the NGO were arrested by Bangladesh Police in May 2004.

On 24 May 2009, Dr. Qazi Faruque Ahmed was replaced as chairman of Proshikha by the governing body and replaced with M. A. Wadud. The decision was upheld by the High Court of Bangladesh on 10 August.

Dr. Qazi Faruque Ahmed was sentenced to one month imprisonment in January 2018 for violating the 2009 High court verdict. He was told to had over the Proshika building in Mirpur to officials of Proshika and its new chairman advocate M. A. Wadud. Ahmed had taken over the office building of the NGO through force and hired thugs.

Empowerment through Law of the Common People organized a Human Rights school for law school students from Bangladesh, India, and Nepal at the Proshika HRDC, Koitta, Manikganj District.

References

Organizations established in 1976
Non-profit organisations based in Bangladesh
Economic development organizations
Microfinance organizations
Poverty-related organizations
Community development organizations